Christian Deuza (born 3 January 1944) is a French gymnast. He competed at the 1968 Summer Olympics and the 1972 Summer Olympics.

References

1944 births
Living people
French male artistic gymnasts
Olympic gymnasts of France
Gymnasts at the 1968 Summer Olympics
Gymnasts at the 1972 Summer Olympics
People from Boulogne-sur-Mer
Sportspeople from Pas-de-Calais
20th-century French people